Allard Burgtem Antonides (1620–1685) was one of five Schepens (Dutch for aldermen or magistrate) in New Amsterdam and early New York City, the city that was to become New York City. As a representative of New Amsterdam and the New Netherlands colony, Antonides made significant contributions during his appeals to the Dutch monarchy. In 1664, when the British Empire conquered the colony, Antonides anglicized his surname to 'Anthony' and maintained his post until shortly before his death. Though he represented the Dutch colonists, his direct descendants are said to be of Spanish ancestry, possibly gaining access to the Netherlands during the Spanish occupation before its establishment as a separate nation. His place in the history of colonial Holland can be compared to the well-known Peter Stuyvesant and the less-known Willem Verhulst.

See also
Nine Men

References

1620 births
1685 deaths
Dutch police officers
Dutch people of Spanish descent
People of the Province of New York